Kirkville is a census-designated place and unincorporated community in Itawamba County, Mississippi, United States.

It was first named as a CDP in the 2020 Census which listed a population of 308.

History
Kirkville is named for Dr. J.D. Kirk.

The population in 1900 was 50.

The Kirkville post office was established prior to the Civil War, and was still in operation in 1905.

A stave mill was located in Kirkville in the early 1900s.  Many of its workers had come from the Green River valley in Kentucky.

The Kirkville Baptist Church and Cemetery are located in the settlement.  J.D. Kirk is interred in the cemetery.

Demographics

2020 census

Note: the US Census treats Hispanic/Latino as an ethnic category. This table excludes Latinos from the racial categories and assigns them to a separate category. Hispanics/Latinos can be of any race.

References

Unincorporated communities in Itawamba County, Mississippi
Unincorporated communities in Mississippi
Census-designated places in Itawamba County, Mississippi